Slavomir Miklovš (16 May 1934 – 21 July 2011) was the Byzantine Catholic bishop of Eparchy of Križevci (in former Yugoslavia, present day Croatia). He was an ethnic Rusyn.

Ordained to the priesthood in 1964, he became bishop of the eparchy in 1983 retiring in 2009.

Notes

External links
http://www.gcatholic.org/dioceses/diocese/kriz0.htm#24739
http://www.catholic-hierarchy.org/bishop/bmiklovs.html

1934 births
2011 deaths
20th-century Eastern Catholic bishops
21st-century Eastern Catholic bishops
Ruthenian Catholic bishops
Croatian bishops
Croatian Eastern Catholics
Croatian people of Rusyn descent
People from South Bačka District
Serbian people of Rusyn descent